

This is a list of the Pennsylvania state historical markers in Luzerne County.

This is intended to be a complete list of the official state historical markers placed in Luzerne County, Pennsylvania by the Pennsylvania Historical and Museum Commission (PHMC). The locations of the historical markers, as well as the latitude and longitude coordinates as provided by the PHMC's database, are included below when available. There are 64 historical markers located in Luzerne County.

Historical markers

See also

List of Pennsylvania state historical markers
National Register of Historic Places listings in Luzerne County, Pennsylvania

References

External links
Pennsylvania Historical Marker Program
Pennsylvania Historical & Museum Commission

Luzerne County
Pennsylvania state historical markers in Luzerne County
Tourist attractions in Luzerne County, Pennsylvania
History of Luzerne County, Pennsylvania